The Smithsonian Contributions and Studies Series is a collection of serial periodical publications produced by the Smithsonian Institution, detailing advances in various scientific and societal fields to which the Smithsonian Institution has made contributions.

History
The Smithsonian Institution began publishing consolidated compilations of quarto-sized papers in 1848, under the name Smithsonian Contributions to Knowledge.  In 1862 octavo-sized papers called Smithsonian Miscellaneous Collections were added, followed by the monographic Bulletin of the United States National Museum in 1875, and the compiled Proceedings of the United States National Museum in 1878. Annual Reports of Smithsonian Institution administrative and scholarly achievements, and accessions to the collections, began issuing in 1881, with accession and donor information being split off in 1993 as the Annals of the Smithsonian Institution.

The Smithsonian Contributions to Knowledge ceased publication in 1916, followed by the cessation of the Smithsonian Miscellaneous Collections in 1968, and the Bulletin of the United States National Museum in 1971. In their place, the Smithsonian Institution began publication of a variety of different series focused on specific areas of scientific or societal study.

Series

Discontinued

Current

References

External links
 

Smithsonian Institution publications
Multidisciplinary scientific journals
Publications established in 1848
English-language journals